Thomas Patching (fl. 1386–1408) of Chichester, Sussex, was an English politician.

He was a Member (MP) of the Parliament of England for Chichester in 1386, February 1388, January 1390, 1391, 1393, September 1397 and 1399. He was Mayor of Chichester Michaelmas in 1407–08.

References

14th-century births
15th-century deaths
English MPs 1386
15th-century English people
Mayors of Chichester
English MPs February 1388
English MPs January 1390
English MPs 1391
English MPs 1393
English MPs September 1397
English MPs 1399